Châteauguay—Huntingdon was a federal electoral district in Quebec, Canada, that was represented in the House of Commons of Canada from 1917 to 1949.

History
This riding was created in 1914 from Châteauguay and Huntingdon ridings.

It initially consisted of the Counties of Châteauguay and Huntingdon.

In 1933, it was redefined to consist of:
 the county of Châteauguay except the municipalities of Ste-Philomène, St-Joachim, and the towns of De Léry and of Châteauguay;
 the county of Huntingdon except the municipality of Ste-Barbe;
 in the county of Beauharnois, the municipality of St-Etienne; and
 in the county of St. Johns, the municipalities of St-Bernard-de-Lacolle, Notre-Dame-du-Mont-Carmel and the village of Lacolle.

It was abolished in 1947 when it was merged into Châteauguay—Huntingdon—Laprairie.

Members of Parliament

This riding elected the following Members of Parliament:

Election results

By-election: On Mr. Robb accepting an office of emolument under the Crown, 29 December 1921

By-election: On Mr. Robb accepting an office of emolument under the Crown, 5 October 1926

By-election: On Mr. Robb's death, 11 November 1929

See also 

 List of Canadian federal electoral districts
 Past Canadian electoral districts

External links
Riding history from the Library of Parliament

Former federal electoral districts of Quebec